Emil Lőrincz (born 29 September 1965) is a retired Hungarian football defender.

References

1965 births
Living people
Hungarian footballers
MTK Budapest FC players
R.W.D. Molenbeek players
Association football defenders
Hungarian expatriate footballers
Expatriate footballers in Belgium
Hungarian expatriate sportspeople in Belgium
Hungary international footballers
Hungarian football managers
Zalaegerszegi TE managers
Pécsi MFC managers
Footballers from Budapest